Platyptilia toxochorda is a moth of the family Pterophoridae. It is known from São Tomé and Principe off the western coast of Central Africa.

References

toxochorda
Endemic moths of São Tomé and Príncipe
Moths described in 1934